"Old Town Road" is the debut mainstream single by American rapper Lil Nas X, first released independently in December 2018. After gaining popularity, the single was re-released by Columbia Records in March 2019. Lil Nas X also recorded a remix with American country singer Billy Ray Cyrus, which was released on April 5, 2019. Both were included in Lil Nas X's second EP, 7 (2019).

The song has been widely labeled as "country rap", a genre that had not often reached the mainstream prior to its release. Dutch record producer YoungKio composed the instrumental and made it available for purchase online in 2018. It features a sample of "34 Ghosts IV" by the American industrial rock band Nine Inch Nails. The sample was placed behind trap-style Roland TR-808 drums and bass. Lil Nas X purchased the instrumental for US$30 and recorded "Old Town Road" in one day. At the time, he had been living with his sister after dropping out of college; his real-world struggles were an influence on some of the lyrics.

The song initially gained popularity on the social video sharing app TikTok and eventually entered the  Billboard charts in March 2019. The song reached number 19 on the Billboard Hot Country Songs chart before the magazine disqualified it from the chart on the grounds that it did not fit the genre, sparking a debate on the definition of country music. Though it was not re-entered onto the overall country charts, both versions of the song collectively peaked at number one on the general Billboard Hot 100, for a record-breaking nineteen consecutive weeks and the remix peaked at #50 on Billboard's Country Airplay chart. One or more versions of "Old Town Road" have topped the national singles charts in Australia, Canada, France, Germany, Ireland, the Netherlands, New Zealand, Norway, Switzerland and the United Kingdom, and have charted in the top 10 in various other markets.

The song was certified diamond by the RIAA in October 2019 for selling ten million total units in the United States, the fastest song to be certified diamond. At the 62nd Annual Grammy Awards, the remix featuring Billy Ray Cyrus was nominated for Record of the Year and won Best Pop Duo/Group Performance and Best Music Video. In October 2019, Nas X's label Columbia Records/Sony Music Entertainment, won the Music & Sound Recordings Award from SAG-AFTRA "for work that exemplifies equal access" of LGBTQ and "other misrepresented or underrepresented groups."
In September 2021, the song set the record as the second highest certified song ever by the RIAA with 16-times platinum status in the United States, meaning it accumulated 16 million equivalent song units. It has sold over 18 million records worldwide, making it one of the best-selling singles of all time. Rolling Stone named it the 490th greatest song of all time in its 2021 list.

Background and recording

Country rap, and its subgenre, country trap, emerged onto the mainstream following the American rapper Young Thug's experimental mixtape Beautiful Thugger Girls (2017). Lil Nas X has cited Young Thug as a pioneer of country trap. In May 2018, Lil Tracy and Lil Uzi Vert ignited the trend with their country rap single "Like a Farmer (Remix)".

In 2018, Lil Nas X dropped out of college to pursue a music career even though he was discouraged by his parents. He moved in with his sister, spending time promoting his music on the Internet while having just three hours of sleep each night. Lil Nas X found the beat for "Old Town Road" in October 2018 and began writing after his sister told him he had to move out soon. Lil Nas X felt like he was "out of options" and said that his sister's and parents' frustrations with him inspired the song's chorus, "can't nobody tell me nothing". Within a month of writing it, Lil Nas X chose to alter the song's meaning so that the "old town road" would be a symbol of success. Lil Nas X recorded the song on December 2, 2018, at the CinCoYo Recording Studio in Atlanta, and released it the same day on SoundCloud under the title "Old Town Road (I Got the Horses in the Back)". The Dutch record producer YoungKio produced the beat a year before the song's release and uploaded it to his online store for selling beats. He sampled Nine Inch Nails' track "34 Ghosts IV", modifying it with studio techniques so that it sounded like an old field recording, then reordering sections in an effort to make the austere original more catchy. He had never heard of Nine Inch Nails before stumbling upon "34 Ghosts IV". Lil Nas X bought the beat from YoungKio for $30, but since purchases on his online store were anonymous, YoungKio did not know the song was purchased by Lil Nas X until he saw it in an Instagram meme in December 2018. Trent Reznor later said that, shortly after the song began gaining traction, he received a call from Lil Nas X's manager about the sample, asking for clearance to use it, which he granted. He described the song as "undeniably hooky".

On December 4, 2018, a day after the original version's release, Lil Nas X tweeted that he wanted Cyrus on the song. Lil Nas X knew of Cyrus because of his role on the Disney Channel television series Hannah Montana. The country singer Jake Owen was originally approached to co-write and record the first remix of "Old Town Road". The Columbia Records executive, Ron Perry, reached out to Cyrus' wife Tish Cyrus saying that he would love it if Cyrus were to hear "Old Town Road". Cyrus first heard the song over coffee on March 16, 2019, when Tish played it to him. Cyrus explained that he loved the original song the first time he heard it. Cyrus also mentioned that he related to the song the first time he heard it, connecting the "old town road" to the Old Town Bridge in Argillite, Kentucky, that he used to play on as a child. In response to Billboard removing "Old Town Road" from the Hot Country Songs chart, Cyrus tweeted his support for Lil Nas X and noted that the removal put him in the ranks of great outlaws.

Composition

"Old Town Road" has been variously described by publications as a country rap, trap, pop, country, rock Southern hip hop, or country trap song. Lil Nas X himself said that he regards it as the latter. Produced by YoungKio, "Old Town Road" samples Nine Inch Nails' track "34 Ghosts IV" from their sixth studio album Ghosts I–IV (2008). The song prominently features the playing of a banjo along with trap-style Roland TR-808 drums and bass throughout. It has been compared to Lil Tracy's 2018 single "Like a Farmer", which was later remixed by Lil Uzi Vert.

The song is composed in the key of G minor with a chord progression of Gm-Badd9-F-Cm7. It has an approximate tempo of 68 beats per minute.<ref>{{Cite web|last=Kopf |first=Dan|url= Secret To 'Old Town Roads Record-Breaking Success? Kids Are Obsessed With It|work=The Quartzy|date=July 29, 2019|access-date=August 19, 2019}}</ref>

Release and promotion
"Old Town Road" was released independently as a single on December 3, 2018, during the rise of the "Yeehaw Agenda" meme, a movement appropriating cowboy fashion and culture. Danny Kang, the manager of the viral country artist Mason Ramsey, suggested to Rolling Stone that Lil Nas X listed the song under the country music genre on SoundCloud and iTunes as a way to manipulate chart algorithms, as it would be easier to top the country charts than the dominant hip hop/rap charts. Lil Nas X began creating memes to promote "Old Town Road" before it was picked up by TikTok users. The song's first music video is composed entirely of footage and clips from the 2018 Western action-adventure game, Red Dead Redemption 2.

The song gained traction in late December 2018 after becoming the "Yeehaw Challenge" meme on TikTok, where users created short videos set to the song. The challenge is credited with launching the song to enter the Billboard Hot 100 at number 83, the chart on which the song has since peaked at number one. The song's popularity grew so quickly that radio stations had to download the audio from YouTube. On March 22, 2019, the success of the song allowed Lil Nas X to sign to Columbia Records, which now distributes the single.

The first official remix of "Old Town Road", featuring the American country singer Billy Ray Cyrus, was released on April 5, 2019, by Columbia Records. The remix was recorded in support of "Old Town Road" being recognized as a country song. A limited edition 7-inch vinyl single was made available for purchase on May 1, 2019, with the remix on the A-side and the original on the B-side. The remix was eventually included with the original on Lil Nas X's second EP, 7. The music video for the remix was released on May 17, 2019. It was directed by Calmatic, and has guest appearances by Chris Rock, HaHa Davis, Rico Nasty, Diplo, Jozzy, Young Kio and Vince Staples.

On March 29, 2019, Lil Nas X danced to "Old Town Road" with the Atlanta Hawks cheerleaders during a basketball game at State Farm Arena. On April 29, 2019, Lil Nas X and Cyrus performed the live debut of "Old Town Road" as part of Diplo's set at the Stagecoach Festival. On June 24, 2019, Lil Nas X and Cyrus performed the song together on a saloon-themed stage for the 2019 BET Awards.

On January 26, 2020, Lil Nas X performed "Old Town Road" at the 62nd Annual Grammy Awards with Diplo, BTS, Mason Ramsey and Billy Ray Cyrus, before finishing his performance with the remix of "Rodeo" along with Nas.

Genre controversy

"Old Town Road" achieved a rare feat in Billboard history when it simultaneously charted on the Billboard Hot 100, Hot Country Songs and Hot R&B/Hip-Hop Songs charts in March 2019. However, Billboard quietly removed "Old Town Road" from its Hot Country chart for "not [embracing] enough elements of today's country music". Had it not been disqualified, "Old Town Road" would have been the Hot Country Songs number-one song, in the chart dated April 6, 2019. Lil Nas X said he was "extremely disappointed" by the decision. In an interview, Time reporter Andrew R. Chow brought up Billboards decision to remove "Old Town Road" from the country chart but to keep it on the R&B/Hip-Hop chart, asking Lil Nas X if he considered "Old Town Road" a country song. Lil Nas X replied, "The song is country trap. It's not one, it's not the other. It's both. It should be on both [charts]." Lil Nas X submitted the song for consideration in rap categories at the 62nd Annual Grammy Awards, but the award show's rap committee recategorized it in Best Pop Duo/Group Performance, where it ultimately won.

The exclusion of "Old Town Road" brought criticism of the evaluation of the work of non-white artists in the country genre, with the Rolling Stone writer Elias Leight referring to Beyoncé, another black artist, whose song "Daddy Lessons" failed to be considered a country song by The Recording Academy in 2016. Leight also pointed out other difficulties faced by black artists making cross-genre music, noting that the rapper Juice Wrld's Death Race for Love (2019) would "probably be the most commercially successful rock album of 2019", but would never appear on rock charts or playlists, another genre, like country, predominated by white artists. In the music journalist Robert Christgau's opinion, "Taking 'Old Town Road' off the country chart strikes me as racist pure and simple, because country radio remains racist regardless of the Darius Ruckers and Kane Browns it makes room for." In light of the criticism, Billboard later stated that the decision to remove "Old Town Road" from the Hot Country Songs chart had nothing to do with Lil Nas X's race. When asked if he believed the decision by Billboard had any racial undertones, Lil Nas X replied, "I believe whenever you're trying something new, it's always going to get some kind of bad reception."

Despite being removed from the main Country Songs chart, "Old Town Road" managed to chart on Billboard's Country Airplay chart, entering at number 53 and peaking at number 50. In response, Sony Music Nashville CEO Randy Goodman told Billboard that his team had started testing the song in some country radio markets, adding "it would be negligent not to look at it".

Commercial performance

In the United States, the original version of "Old Town Road" reached number one on the Billboard Hot 100 in the week ending April 13, 2019; at one minute and 53 seconds in length, it became the shortest number-one single since "I'm Henry VIII, I Am" by Herman's Hermits in 1965 and the fifth-shortest in the history of the chart. In the following week, it and the newly released remix featuring Billy Ray Cyrus received a combined 143 million streams, surpassing Drake's "In My Feelings", which in the previous year had amassed 116.2 million in the same period, as the song with the highest single-week streaming figure in the country. This song also became Cyrus's biggest hit in the U.S. since "Achy Breaky Heart" peaked at number four on the Billboard Hot 100 27 years ago. "Old Town Road" continued to exceed 100 million streams in each of the eight following weeks, and in June 2019, was responsible for the three highest weekly U.S. streaming totals in the history of digital music, as well as nine of the eleven highest overall. In October 2019, "Old Town Road" became the fastest single in RIAA history to receive diamond certification in the United States. The certification, which is awarded to singles that attain national combined sales and streams of ten million units, was achieved by the song in its eleventh month of release. The single had sold 1.6 million digital copies in the United States by February 2020.

"Old Town Road" topped the Hot 100 for nineteen consecutive weeks from April 13 to August 17, 2019. On August 24, it was finally unseated by Billie Eilish's "Bad Guy" which had waited in the runner-up spot for nine nonconsecutive weeks. "Old Town Road"'s overall run at number one is the longest in chart history, surpassing the previous record of sixteen weeks achieved by both "One Sweet Day" by Mariah Carey and Boyz II Men (1995–96), and "Despacito" by Luis Fonsi and Daddy Yankee featuring Justin Bieber (2017). In July 2019, "Old Town Road" also became the first number-one single on the Rolling Stone Top 100 chart when it held the position in the chart's inaugural edition. In accordance with their methodologies, Billboard and Rolling Stone each assign a single position to "Old Town Road" on their respective charts by combining the performance figures of every released version of the song determined to be sufficiently similar to the original. The former publication credits the entirety of the song's chart run solely to the remix featuring Cyrus.

Elsewhere, the original version of the song topped the national singles charts in at least ten other countries — Australia (thirteen weeks), France and Norway (eight weeks each), Austria (six weeks); Switzerland (five weeks), Denmark, Germany and Ireland (four weeks each), Portugal (three weeks), and the United Kingdom (two weeks) — and charted within the top ten in more than five others. The remix featuring Cyrus achieved a record 19-weeks run at number one on the Canadian Hot 100, and peaked within the top five in more than five other markets. Both versions of the song were credited as number-one singles in Belgium, the Netherlands and New Zealand.

Track listing
Vinyl release

Credits and personnel
Credits and personnel for "Old Town Road" and the four official remixes adapted from Tidal.

 Lil Nas X – lead artist, songwriter
 YoungKio – producer, songwriter
 Trent Reznor – producer, songwriter, background vocals 
 Atticus Ross – producer, songwriter
 Cinco – recording engineer
 Billy Ray Cyrus – featured artist, songwriter 
 Jocelyn "Jozzy" Donald – background vocals, songwriter 
 Andrew "VoxGod" Bolooki – vocal producer, mix engineer 
 Joe Grasso – engineer 
 Eric Lagg – mastering engineer 
 Diplo – re-mixer 
 Young Thug – featured artist, songwriter 
 Mason Ramsey – featured artist, songwriter 
 Jake Owen – background vocals, songwriter 
 Ernest K. Smith – songwriter 
 A Bainz – recording engineer 
 Shaan Singh – recording engineer 
 Alex Tumay – vocal producer 
 Joey Moi – vocal producer 
 RM – featured artist, songwriter 

 Awards and nominations 
Listed below are awards and nominations for both "Old Town Road" and "Old Town Road (Remix)" featuring Billy Ray Cyrus.

Charts

Weekly charts

Monthly charts

Year-end charts

Decade-end charts

All-time charts

Certifications

Old Town Road

Old Town Road (feat. RM of BTS)

Other remixes and versions

The single's second official remix, "Old Town Road (Diplo Remix)", was released on April 29, 2019, with additional production by the American DJ Diplo. The country music website, The Boot, described it as a "remix of [a] remix" as it still retained vocals from Billy Ray Cyrus. The remix was premiered at Diplo's set for the country music Stagecoach Festival alongside the first-ever live performance of "Old Town Road" by Lil Nas X and Cyrus. Just before Lil Nas X and Cyrus' surprise on-stage appearance at Stagecoach 2019, Diplo claimed. "Let me tell you, ["Old Town Road" is] a country song." The Diplo remix peaked at number 24 on the RMNZ New Zealand Hot Singles chart. The remix is included on Diplo's second studio album, Diplo Presents Thomas Wesley, Chapter 1: Snake Oil (2020).

A third official remix, titled "Old Town Road (Remix)", was released on July 12, 2019. It retains Cyrus' guest appearance and adds the American rapper Young Thug and the American singer Mason Ramsey. The remix was released in an effort to keep "Old Town Road" at number one on the Billboard Hot 100, as the song was two weeks away from tying for the all-time Hot 100 record held by "One Sweet Day" by Mariah Carey and Boyz II Men and "Despacito" by Luis Fonsi featuring Daddy Yankee; it has since broken that record. In an interview with Billboard in March 2019, the producer YoungKio said that he would want Young Thug for a remix of "Old Town Road", saying, "I've listened to every single song of his, and I think he's qualified to do this remix. I've listened to Beautiful Thugger Girls, and he has some country vibes on there." Young Thug has been previously credited with bringing country trap into the mainstream with his experimental mixtape, Beautiful Thugger Girls (2017). Lil Nas X called him a pioneer of bridging the gap between country and trap.

The single's fourth official remix, "Old Town Road (Seoul Town Road Remix)", featuring the South Korean rapper RM of BTS was released on July 24, 2019. It is the only official remix to not feature Cyrus. Lil Nas X announced shortly afterwards that "Seoul Town Road" would be the final remix. It reached number eight on the RMNZ New Zealand Hot Singles chart.

The American country singer Jake Owen and the American rapper Lil Wayne both recorded verses for planned remixes that were unofficially released. Owen's remix was shared on The Bobby Bones Show in May 2019 and his verse was later replaced by Ramsey. Lil Wayne's remix was leaked on July 25, 2019, and he performed it live at Lollapalooza the next month. The American rapper Cupcakke released her leaked remix of "Old Town Road", titled "Old Town Hoe", on April 17, 2019. The remix reinterprets the lyric "I'm gonna ride 'til I can't no more" in a sexually explicit way. A music video was released in May 2019 and has Cupcakke and her backup dancers riding toy horses and handling phallic objects, including lollipops, water bottles and corn on the cob. Lil Nas X responded favorably to the remix.

The actor-comedian Omi Vaidya parodied the song with "Oak Tree Road", a song about Asian Indian culture in the US. Postmodern Jukebox also covered the song, doing it in the style of a New Orleans blues song. Miche Braden sang the lead vocals.

The song was featured in an episode of The Proud Family: Louder and Prouder'', fittingly titled "Old Towne Road", with Lil Nas X guest starring as one of the voices. Rather than Billy Ray Cyrus' section of the song, the character of Bobby Proud, voiced by Cedric the Entertainer, joins in with newly written lyrics.

See also

 List of best-selling singles in Australia
 List of number-one singles of 2019 (Australia)
 List of number-one hits of 2019 (Austria)
 List of Canadian Hot 100 number-one singles of 2019
 List of number-one hits of 2019 (Denmark)
 List of number-one hits of 2019 (Germany)
 List of number-one singles of the 2010s (Hungary)
 List of number-one singles of 2019 (Ireland)
 List of number-one singles from the 2010s (New Zealand)
 List of number-one songs in Norway
 List of number-one hits of 2019 (Switzerland)
 List of UK Singles Chart number ones of the 2010s
 List of Billboard Hot 100 number-one singles of 2019
 List of Billboard Hot 100 top 10 singles in 2019
 List of number-one dance airplay hits of 2019 (U.S.)
 List of Billboard Rhythmic number-one songs of the 2010s
List of viral music videos

Notes

References

2018 songs
2018 debut singles
2019 singles
Lil Nas X songs
Songs written by Lil Nas X
Billy Ray Cyrus songs
Songs written by Billy Ray Cyrus
Young Thug songs
Mason Ramsey songs
Songs written by Trent Reznor
Songs written by Atticus Ross
Canadian Hot 100 number-one singles
Columbia Records singles
Country rap songs
Novelty songs
Race-related controversies in music
Irish Singles Chart number-one singles
Music videos directed by Calmatic
Number-one singles in Australia
Number-one singles in France
Number-one singles in New Zealand
Number-one singles in Norway
Number-one singles in Portugal
2019 controversies in the United States
Billboard Hot 100 number-one singles
UK Singles Chart number-one singles
Songs about horses
Internet memes introduced in 2018
Grammy Award for Best Short Form Music Video
Grammy Award for Best Pop Duo/Group Performance
Viral videos
2010s fads and trends
2019 controversies
Male vocal duets